Marshall Gilkes (born September 30, 1978) is an American jazz trombonist and composer.

Biography
Marshall Gilkes was born in Camp Springs, Maryland to a musical family; his mother was a classical vocalist and pianist and his father was a Euphonium player in the US Air Force Band in Washington DC and, later, conductor of several Air Force bands including the US Air Force Academy Band in Colorado Springs, CO. Due to his father's military profession, he had an itinerant upbringing in Washington, D.C., New Hampshire, New Jersey, Alabama, Illinois, and Colorado.

He received his early musical training at the Interlochen Arts Academy, University of Northern Colorado, and William Patterson University. He holds a Bachelor of Music degree from the Juilliard School. His teachers include Joseph Alessi, Conrad Herwig, Mark Burditt, Buddy Baker, Ed Neumeister, and Wycliffe Gordon.

In 2003, Gilkes was a finalist in the Thelonious Monk International Jazz Competition.

Gilkes played in the Maria Schneider Orchestra and David Berger's Sultans of Swing. He is a member of the Edmar Castañeda Trio, and the Slide Monsters trombone quartet. He has performed with the Vanguard Jazz Orchestra, Duke Ellington Orchestra, Stanley Turrentine, and Benny Golson. In the Latin music community, he has performed with Machito, Giovanni Hidalgo, Chico O'Farrill, Tito Nieves, Big 3 Palladium Orchestra, Raulin Rosendo, Ray Sepúlveda, Eddie Santiago, José Alberto "El Canario", and Iroko La Banda. He played in the 2000–2001 National and Japanese tours of the Broadway show Swing!.

Gilkes has toured extensively throughout Europe, Asia, Latin America, and South America. Previous performance engagements include the Umbria Jazz Festival, Vienna Jazz Festival, JVC Jazz Festival, Telluride Jazz Festival, Panama Jazz Festival, Lincoln Center, Tokyo's Orchard Hall, and the Moscow Conservatory. In March 2008, he was invited to perform with the jazz drummer Billy Cobham and the Adelaide Philharmonic at the Adelaide Bank Festival of Arts in Australia. He was a guest performer at the International Trombone Festival from May 28–31, 2008 in Salt Lake City, Utah.

With the exception of one track, he composed new material for his 2004 record, "Edenderry." The album received excellent reviews from, among others, Jazz Times, All About Jazz, and the Trombone Journal.

In 2010, he became a full-time member of the Grammy Award-winning WDR Big Band.

In February 2015, he released his album Köln, his first fronting a big band. Köln received two Grammy nominations for Best Large Jazz Ensemble Album and Best Instrumental Composition.

Discography

As leader
 Edenderry (Alternate Side, 2005)
 Lost Words (Alternate Side, 2008)
 Sound Stories (Alternate Side, 2012)
 Köln (Alternate Side, 2015), with The WDR Big Band
 Always Forward (Alternate Side, 2018), with The WDR Big Band
Waiting to Continue (Alternate Side, 2020)
Cyclic Journey (Alternate Side, 2022)

As sideman
With The Maria Schneider Jazz Orchestra
 Sky Blue (2007)
 The Thompson Fields (2015)
 Data Lords (2020)

With The Ryan Keberle Double Quartet
 Double Quartet (2007)
 Heavy Dreaming (2010)

With Edmar Castañeda
 Cuarto de Colores (2005)
 Entre Cuerdas (2009)

With David Berger
 Marlowe (2004)
 Champian (2007)
 I Had The Craziest Dream (2008)

With others
 The Big 3 Palladium Orchestra - Live at the Blue Note (2004)
 John Fedchock New York Big Band - Up and Running (2007)

References

External links
 Official Website
 Edenderry review at All About Jazz by Michael P. Gladstone

1978 births
Living people
American jazz trombonists
Male trombonists
Juilliard School alumni
University of Northern Colorado alumni
21st-century trombonists
21st-century American male musicians
American male jazz musicians